The Summit railway station is the southern, upper terminus of the Snowdon Mountain Railway, located within yards of the summit of Snowdon. In 2009 a new station building was opened, which was named Hafod Eryri.
 

History
The first buildings on the summit predate the railway, and were erected at the Snowdon summit in 1838 to sell refreshments, and a licence to sell intoxicating liquor was granted in 1845. Very basic accommodation was also provided for visitors. 

The station opened with the railway on 6 April 1896, but both closed the same day following an accident. They reopened a year later, on 9 April 1897. After the station opened, the company strove to get an alcohol licence for its own proposed new hotel, but being unable to, took over both summit huts by 1898.

During the 1930s, many complaints were received about the state of the facilities at the summit and in 1934/5 a new station building was erected in two phases; the upstairs accommodation was completed in 1937. It was designed by Sir Clough Williams-Ellis and included rooms for visitors and a cafe. The other operators were bought out and the ramshackle collection of buildings on the summit was cleared. The flat roof was intended to be used as a viewing platform and some photographs show it being used in this way. However, other photographs taken of the cafe show that the roof leaked, which probably explains why the practice was stopped. The Summit was taken over by government agencies during the war and the accommodation was restricted to staff use afterwards. Having become increasingly dilapidated in post-war decades, this building was described by Prince Charles as "the highest slum in Wales". Its state led to a campaign to replace the building. In April 2006, Snowdonia National Park Authority with the support of the Snowdonia Society agreed a deal to start work on a new cafe and visitor centre complex. By mid-October 2006 the old building had been largely demolished.

The 1930s station operated until 2006 except during World War II. In September 2006 the station and associated buildings were demolished for complete rebuilding, passenger services terminating at Clogwyn until the new visitor centre of Hafod Eryri and station were opened by Welsh First Minister Rhodri Morgan on 12 June 2009.

The new station

The new RIBA Award-winning £8.4 million visitor centre, designed by Ray Hole Architects in conjunction with Arup and built by Carillion, was officially opened on 12 June 2009 by First Minister Rhodri Morgan. The Welsh National Poet, Gwyn Thomas, composed a new couplet for the new building, displayed at its entrance and on the windows, which reads " / The summit of Snowdon: You are, here, nearer to Heaven". The name Hafod Eryri was chosen from several hundred put forward after a competition was held by the BBC.  is Welsh for an upland summer residence, while  is the Welsh name for Snowdonia.

Operation
The station has two platforms.

References

Bibliography

External links

 The line and its stations Snowdon Mountain Railway
 Edwardian 6" map showing the station, overlain with modern satellite images and maps National Library of Scotland
 The station and line Rail Map Online
 Images of the station and line Yahoo

Railway stations in Great Britain opened in 1896
Llanberis
Heritage railway stations in Gwynedd